Mohammad Shirin Maghrebi Tabrizi, known as Shirin or Mullah Mohammad Shirin also known as Shams Maghrebi lived between years 1348 AD until 1406 AD (749-809 AH), is an Iranian poet and a Mystic and a Sufi of the second half of the eighth century AH.

The reason for his fame and nickname to the Maghrebi is considered by some to be his trip to Morocco (called Maghreb in Persian) and wearing a cloak by one of Ibn Arabi's relatives.

Maghrebi in his beliefs was a follower of Ismaeel Sisi and was a good fellow of Noureddin Abdul Rahman Esfarayeni and a companion of Kamal Khujandi. In addition to Ismaeel Sisi, his other teachers are: Baha'uddin Hamedani, Mohiuddin Ibn Arabi, Sa'ad al-Din Tabrizi and Abdul Momen Saravi. Some have attributed him to the method of Suhrawardiyya or Marufieh. Although some of his teachers were raised to be followers of the first tradition, his works indicate that he was strongly interested in the second tradition and the views of Ibn Arabi and his disciples.

According to Ibn Karbalaei, Shamsuddin Eqtabi and his son Abdul Rahim Khuluti Mashreqi were both Maghrebi Tabrizi's disciples. In addition to Persian, poems in Arabic and Azeri Fahlavi have been obtained from him. Most of these poems are mystical subjects, especially the unity of existence, the importance of conduct, closeness and the mystical state of the seeker.

Book
His book of poems is called Divan-e Shams-e Maghrebi. Maghrebi poetry, especially his lyric poems, is in the field of coded mystical literature. The Maghrebi book contains three thousand verses in the form of sonnets, Tarji'band and quatrains, most of which are mystical subjects, especially the unity of existence, the importance of conduct, closeness and the mystical nature of the seeker. With all the attention that Maghrebi pays to mysticism and monotheistic subjects, his poetry is devoid of excellent artistic appeal. Maghrebi's poetry is an imitation of the works of the sixth and seventh centuries AH and is devoid of heartwarming innovative industries and new uses of Metaphor, Simile and other literary arrays.

In addition to Divan, he has other book as well, such as: Asrar al-Fatihah, Resaleye Jame Jahan Nama in commentary of Ibn Arabi's views, and a selection of commentaries on the ode Ta'iyyah of Ibn al-Farid, Dorrol Farid Fi Marefati Maratebot Towhid in Persian with subject of monotheism and the verbs and attributes of truth, Nazhatal Sasania, Nasihat Nameh, Era'atal Daghaeq fi Sharhe Mar'atal Haqaeq.

Sample poem
The first and the last verses of the Divan-e Shams-e Maghrebi were written out as follows:

Also:

Death
Shams-ud-Din Mohammad Maghrebi died in one of the years 809 to 810 AH in Sorkhab, West Azerbaijan and was buried in Baba Farid yard in Maqbaratoshoara, Tabriz, Iran.

See also
 Fahlavīyāt
 Sanai
 Karnameye Balkh
 Tariq ut-tahqiq
 Sheikh San'Aan

References

External links
 A Critical Edition of the Divan of Muhammad Shirin Maghribi
 Maghrebi Tabrizi on Ancestry

Burials in Maqbaratoshoara
Poets from Tabriz
Iranian male poets
14th-century Iranian people
15th-century Iranian people